The following highways are numbered 281:

Canada
 Quebec Route 281

Japan
 Japan National Route 281

United States
 U.S. Route 281
 Alabama State Route 281
 Arkansas Highway 281
 California State Route 281
 Florida State Road 281
 Georgia State Route 281
 Iowa Highway 281
 Kentucky Route 281
 Maryland Route 281
 Minnesota State Highway 281 (former)
 Montana Secondary Highway 281 (former)
 New Mexico State Route 281
 New York State Route 281
 North Carolina Highway 281
 North Dakota Highway 281
 Ohio State Route 281
 Oklahoma State Highway 281A
 Oregon Route 281
 Pennsylvania Route 281
 South Carolina Highway 281
 Tennessee State Route 281
 Texas State Highway 281 (former proposed)
 Texas State Highway Loop 281
 Farm to Market Road 281 (Texas)
 Utah State Route 281 (former)
 Washington State Route 281